Citreimonas is a genus of bacteria from the family of Rhodobacteraceae with one known species (Citreimonas salinaria). Citreimonas salinaria has been isolated from hypersaline water from a solar saltern in Seosin in Korea.

References

Rhodobacteraceae
Bacteria genera
Monotypic bacteria genera